The Colt 9mm SMG, also known as the  Colt Model 635 or  Colt M635, is a 9×19mm Parabellum submachine gun manufactured by Colt, based on the M16 rifle.

Design details
The Colt 9mm SMG is a closed bolt, blowback operated SMG, rather than the conventional direct impingement gas operation of the standard 5.56×45mm M16 type rifle. As a closed bolt weapon, the Colt SMG is inherently more accurate than open bolt weapons such as the Israeli UZI.

The overall aesthetics are identical to most M16 type rifles. Changes include a large plastic brass deflector protruding from the rear quarter of the ejection port, and a correspondingly shorter dust cover. Factory Colt 9mm SMGs are equipped with a 10.5 inch length barrel and have an M16 style upper receiver, which means they feature a fixed carry handle, no forward assist and A1 sights (with 50 and 100 meter settings). The magazine well of the receiver is modified with pinned-in blocks to allow the use of smaller 9 mm magazines. The magazines themselves are a copy of the UZI magazine, modified to fit the Colt and lock the bolt back after the last shot.

Variants

Current Colt production models are the R0635 (RO635) which features a Safe/Semi/Full Auto selective fire trigger group and the R0639(RO639) which features a Safe/Semi/3-round Burst selective fire trigger group. Both are equipped with a 10.5 inch length barrel. The 633 was a modified compact version with a  barrel, hydraulic buffer and simplified front sight post used by the DEA.

The most common model is the 635, the latest version of which are simply marked SMG 9mm NATO. Until early 2010s, there are newer variants, R0991(RO991), R0992(RO992) and R6951 are introduced. The R0991 features Safe/Semi/Full Auto selective fire is constructed with Rail Integration System (RIS) picatinny rails on the flat-top receiver as well as around the barrel which allows the easy mounting of ancillary devices, has 10.5" barrel and equipped with a third generation composite buttstock; The R0992 has almost all the same features to the R0991, except the selective fire mode is Safe/Semi/3-round Burst only; The R6951 has almost all the same features of the R0991 and R0992, but doesn't have selective fire and has a 16.1" barrel instead of the 10.5" one.

A suppressed variant known as the "DEA model" exists that uses an integral Knights Armament Company made suppressor covered with an M16A2 handguard.

Users

: Used by the Argentine Army.
: Used by the Octopus Unit of Andhra Pradesh Police.
: Used by IDF special forces.
: Used by the Pasukan Khas Udara (PASKAU) Counter-Terrorism Forces of the Royal Malaysian Air Force
: designated 9 Millimeter Submachine gun and used by the U.S. Marine Corps. Also used by the U.S. Marshals Service, Los Angeles Police Department SWAT, U.S. Dept of Justice-Federal Bureau of Prisons, U.S. Diplomatic Security Service (DSS), and a number of other federal agencies. The Drug Enforcement Administration was previously issued with them, but no longer in service. United States Department of Energy used them for protection of nuclear weapons and facilities.

Gallery

See also
 MP5
 QCW-05
 Vityaz-SN
 FAMAE SAF
 PP-19 Bizon

References

Notes

External links

Chuck Taylor's report on Colt SMG
Colt Defense

9mm Parabellum submachine guns
ArmaLite AR-10 derivatives
9mm SMG
Police weapons
Submachine guns of the United States
United States Marine Corps equipment
Military equipment introduced in the 1980s